Barbara Krystyna Tuge-Erecińska (born 24 March 1956) is Polish diplomat and civil service member who served as a Ambassador of the Republic of Poland to Sweden (1991–1997), to Denmark (2001–2005), to the United Kingdom of Great Britain and Northern Ireland (2006–2012), and to Cyprus (2014–2018). She also served as a Undersecretary of State (1999-2001) and Secretary of State (2005-2006) in the Ministry of Foreign Affairs.

Life 
After graduating in 1980 from the University of Gdańsk at the onset of the anti-communist Solidarity movement, Tuge-Erecińska joined the Union and set up the Solidarity International Department. "In a way, this was my first diplomatic post," she said. Her father and grandfather were members of the Home Army (Armia Krajowa) during the German and Soviet occupations of Poland in World War II. They were arrested by the Soviets and sent to Siberia. Both survived the gulags thanks to the lifesaving determination of her father.

Tuge-Erecińska worked closely with Solidarity leader Lech Wałęsa during the 1980s. When martial law was declared in Poland on 13 December 1981, she joined the protest in the shipyard. She was the one to smuggle out the official statement by the striking workers that the resistance would continue in spite of military coup d'état. She assisted families of political prisoners and set up a commission with the Polish Church to help them. Active in the underground during the martial law in Poland, she was harassed by the communist party. "It wasn't a big deal compared to what happened to some," she remembered. "The worst experience was when my son was one year old – to see those security men searching in my baby's cot." Nearly a decade later, in 1989 during the first partially free elections in the Eastern Bloc, Tuge-Erecińska was appointed Gdańsk’s liaison with the foreign dignitaries and journalists visiting Wałęsa, Poland's ‘real’ president. After Wałęsa’s election victory in 1990, she was appointed Ambassador to Sweden (1991–1997). "At 35, not only was I the only female at our embassy, I was also the youngest member of staff," she told British Diplomat magazine.

In 1999, Tuge-Erecińska became Poland's first woman Deputy Foreign Minister—the position held until 2001, and again in 2005. During her inaugural speech as Ambassador to the UK, Tuge-Erecińska said: I feel privileged to be posted to this special place, which supported us during the darkest days... . Her work as the highest ranking diplomat revolves around the Polish participation in the EU with its complex political life and economy. Between 2014 and 2018 she was ambassador to Cyprus.

Her son studied in Denmark and now works in the UK.

Awards
 Gold Cross of Merit – 1997
Commander of the Order of Merit of the Italian Republic – 2000
Commander of the Order of Merit of the Republic of Hungary – 2001
Commander of the Order of the Dannebrog – 2005
Grand Cross of the Order pro Merito Melitensi – 2011
 Grand Cross of the Sacred Military Constantinian Order of Saint George – 2012

References

 Alice Miles and Anthony Browne, The Times,  Barbara Tuge-Erecinska is getting down to business 10 February 2007
 European Commission, "Cross-border cooperation under the framework of the Northern Dimension" by Barbara Krystyna Tuge-Erecińska, Secretary of State, Ministry of Foreign Affairs of Poland

See also
 List of Ambassadors of Poland to the United Kingdom
 Poland–United Kingdom relations

1956 births
Ambassadors of Poland to Cyprus
Ambassadors of Poland to Denmark
Ambassadors of Poland to Sweden
Ambassadors of Poland to the United Kingdom
Commander's Crosses of the Order of Merit of the Republic of Hungary (civil)
Commanders of the Order of Merit of the Italian Republic
Commanders of the Order of the Dannebrog
Recipients of the Order pro Merito Melitensi
Living people
Diplomats from Gdańsk
Polish dissidents
Recipients of the Gold Cross of Merit (Poland)
Solidarity (Polish trade union) activists
University of Gdańsk alumni
Polish women ambassadors
20th-century Polish women